Ải Thôn is a suburb of Hanoi in Vietnam. It is located next to Ngọc Thiện 16 miles from the city centre, however it lies in Tân Yên District in Bắc Giang Province.

References 

Populated places in Bắc Giang province